Anisolambda is an extinct genus of litoptern. It lived from the Late Paleocene to the Middle Eocene in what is now Argentina.

Description

This animal is mostly known from fossils of its maxilla, mandible and teeth, and it is therefore difficult to speculate on its appearance. Its molars were primitive in shape, and closely resembled those of the enigmatic Didolodus. They were distinguished from the latter by the presence of a strong paraconid, in an internal position, almost identical in size to the metaconid, and separated from the latter by a narrow indentation.
Anisolambda may have been similar to more recent genera of Proterotheriidae, such as Diadiaphorus or Proterotherium, but without the characteristic limb specializations of the latter genera.

Classification

The genus Anisolambda was first described in 1901 by Florentino Ameghino, based on a mandible with teeth from the Eocene of Argentina. Ameghino latter described fossils of the maxilla, that he attributed to the genus Josepholeidya. Subsequent discoveries in slightly older terrains from the Late Paleocene of Brazil, including associated maxilla and mandible (which is now thought to belong to a different genus, Paranisolambda), have allowed the researchers to understand that Anisolambda and Josepholeidya belonged to the same genus. The type species is Anisolambda fissidens, from the Early and Middle Eocene of Argentina. Anisolambda amel was described by George Gaylord Simpson in 1948.

Anisolambda is one of the earliest litopterns, and its systematic position isn't clear due to its primitive dental characteristics. It is supposed that Anisolambda was one of the earliest and most basal members of Proterotheriidae, a clade of small to medium-sized litopterns, which in the course of their evolution developed horse-like forms, specially regarding the specializations of their legs. Anisolambda belonged to a separate subfamily, Anisolambdinae, including one the most basal proterotheres ; sometimes this clade is elevated to the rank of family, Anisolambdidae.

References

 G. G. Simpson. 1967. The beginning of the age of mammals in South America. Part II. Bulletin of the American Museum of Natural History 137:1-260
 R. Cifelli. 1983. The origin and affinities of the South American Condylarthra and early Tertiary Litopterna (Mammalia). American Museum Novitates 2772:1-49
 M. O. Woodburne, F. J. Goin, M. S. Raigemborn, M. Heizler, J. N. Gelfo and E. V. Oliveira. 2014. Revised timing of the South American early Paleogene land mammal ages. Journal of South American Earth Sciences 54:109-119

Proterotheriids
Paleocene mammals of South America
Eocene mammals of South America
Paleogene Argentina
Fossils of Argentina
Fossil taxa described in 1901
Taxa named by Florentino Ameghino
Prehistoric placental genera
Golfo San Jorge Basin
Sarmiento Formation